The 2017–18 Ford Trophy was the 47th season of the official List A cricket tournament in New Zealand, and the seventh in a sponsorship deal between New Zealand Cricket and Ford Motor Company. The competition ran from 3 December 2017 to 24 February 2018. Canterbury were the defending champions.

The final round of fixtures were all abandoned due to rain. As a result, Central Districts topped the table and were joined in the final stage with Auckland, Northern Districts and Canterbury. After the preliminary final matches, Central Districts and Auckland had progressed to the tournament final.

Auckland won the tournament, beating Central Districts by six wickets in the final.

Points table

 Teams qualified for the finals

Fixtures

Round 1

Round 2

Round 3

Round 4

Round 5

Round 6

Round 7

Round 8

Finals

References

External links
 Series home at ESPN Cricinfo

Ford Trophy
2017–18 New Zealand cricket season
Ford Trophy